Franckeite, chemical formula Pb5Sn3Sb2S14, belongs to a family of complex sulfide minerals. Franckeite is a sulfosalt. It is closely related to cylindrite. 

It was first described in 1893 for an occurrence in Chocaya, Potosí Department, Bolivia. It is named after the mining engineers, Carl and Ernest Francke. It can be found in Bolivia at Poopó in Oruro and at Las Aminas, southeast of Chocaya, in Potosi.  Franckeite has an average density of 5.7 and can be both grayish black, blackish gray in color. 

It occurs in hydrothermal silver-tin deposits in Bolivia and in contact metamorphosed limestone deposit in the Kalkar quarry in California. It occurs with cylindrite, teallite, plagionite, zinkenite, cassiterite, wurtzite, pyrrhotite,
marcasite, arsenopyrite, galena, pyrite, sphalerite, siderite and stannite.

See also
List of minerals
List of minerals named after people

References

Lead minerals
Tin minerals
Antimony minerals
Sulfosalt minerals
Triclinic minerals
Minerals in space group 2